The insular flying fox or Pacific flying fox (Pteropus tonganus) is a species of flying fox in the family Pteropodidae. It is geographically widespread, the most widespread flying fox in the Pacific: it is found in American Samoa, the Cook Islands, Fiji, New Caledonia, Niue, Papua New Guinea, Samoa (where it is called pe'a fanua, pe'a fai and taulaga), the Solomon Islands, Tonga, and Vanuatu.

History

Archaeologists on an excavation site at Rurutu announced in 2006 some important fossil finds:

Description
The range of coloration in this bat species varies somewhat. Its back is described as black or seal brown; its mantle has been called orange, yellow, cream buff, and tawny. This bat lacks an interfemoral membrane; its forearms and tibia are bare, and the fur of the males is described as "stiff, short, oily hairs".

In flight, their outstretched wings appear a translucent dark brown when viewed from below.

Distribution and habitat
The insular flying fox has a widespread distribution in Polynesia. Its range includes Papua New Guinea, the Solomon Islands, Samoa, Tonga, the Cook Islands, Tuvalu, Tokelau, Niue, Vanuatu, New Caledonia, Fiji, Wallis and Futuna. It sometimes migrates between islands and its typical habitat is tropical wet forests, mangrove forests and plantations.

Behavior
Like most species of bat, this flying fox is nocturnal and roosts in colonies high in the canopy. These bats favor lowland native forests, cliffs, islets, and swampy areas. The females give birth to a single offspring each year although occasionally twins are born.

Insular flying foxes are frugivores and eat pollen and nectar. They are important pollinators of Ceiba pentandra and perhaps other species.

Status
The IUCN rates the insular flying fox as being of "Least Concern" because it has a wide range and presumed large population. It is hunted for food on some islands and it is also threatened by degradation of native forest for logging and for conversion to plantations and cultivated land. Populations appear to be declining but not at such a rate as to warrant placing the bat in a more threatened category.

Associated viruses
Bats are well known as natural hosts and possibly reservoirs of a large diversity of both RNA and DNA viruses, of which some are responsible for emerging infections and disease outbreaks. Faecal matter from four roosting sites of insular flying foxes in Tonga was sampled for viruses during 2014–2015. Analysis of the recovered DNA sequences revealed 48 single-stranded DNA viruses, including 5 cyclovirus and 14 gemycircularvirus novel species. Three of the viruses were sampled in consecutive years and six were found at multiple sites indicating that they are persistently associated with insular flying fox colonies.

References

Pteropus
Bats of Oceania
Fauna of Micronesia
Mammals of American Samoa
Mammals of Fiji
Fauna of Guam
Mammals of New Caledonia
Fauna of Niue
Fauna of Palau
Mammals of Papua New Guinea
Mammals of Samoa
Mammals of the Solomon Islands
Fauna of the Cook Islands
Mammals of Tonga
Mammals of Vanuatu
Mammals described in 1830
Taxonomy articles created by Polbot